Huperzia australiana is a species of small terrestrial plant, a firmoss, in the Lycopodiaceae (clubmoss) family.  It is native to Australia and New Zealand.

Distribution and habitat
The plant occurs at sheltered sites in subalpine and subantarctic regions, in grasslands and around bogs, up to 2000 m above sea level.

Description
Huperzia australiana has decumbent stems with densely tufted, erect branches up to 300 mm long, usually branched 2 or 3 times.  The leaves are crowded, appressed to spreading, 5–9 mm long, 0.5–1.5 mm wide in the middle and tapering to a point.  It reproduces vegetatively through the often numerous small bulbils which form along the stem.  The sporophylls are similar to the foliage leaves; no strobili are formed; the bright yellow, kidney-shaped sporangia are produced in the upper leaf axils.

References

australiana
Flora of New South Wales
Flora of Victoria (Australia)
Flora of Tasmania
Flora of Macquarie Island
Flora of New Zealand
Flora of the Chatham Islands
Flora of the Auckland Islands
Plants described in 1985